Dyschirius afghanus is a species of ground beetle in the subfamily Scaritinae. It was described by Jedlicka in 1967.

References

afghanus
Beetles described in 1967